"Rejection Slips" is a comic poem by American author  Isaac Asimov, written in 1959 for the collection Nine Tomorrows. It intends to illustrate the three approaches of the most important editors in science fiction at the time (John W. Campbell of Astounding, Horace Gold of Galaxy Science Fiction and Anthony Boucher of The Magazine of Fantasy and Science Fiction) when they had a story to reject. Campbell sent lengthy and turgid analyses, Gold abusive little notes and Boucher rejection slips so gentle one wondered whether he was taking the story or not.

References

External links 
 

Short stories by Isaac Asimov
1959 short stories